Frangula californica (previously classified as Rhamnus californica) is a species of flowering plant in the buckthorn family native to western North America. It produces edible fruits and seeds. It is commonly known as California coffeeberry and California buckthorn.

Distribution
It is native to California, the Southwestern United States, and Baja California state in Mexico. It is an introduced species in Hawaii.

The plant occurs in oak woodland and chaparral habitats, numerous others in its range. Individual plants can live an estimated 100 to 200 years.

Description
It is variable in form across subspecies.

The branches may have a reddish tinge and the new twigs are often red in color. The alternately arranged evergreen leaves are dark green above and paler on the undersides. The leaves have thin blades in moist habitat, and smaller, thicker blades in dry areas.

Inflorescence and fruit
The 1/8" greenish flowers occur in clusters in the leaf axils, have 5 sepals, and 5 shorter petals. It blooms in May and June. The fruit is a juicy drupe which may be green, red, or black. It is just under a centimeter long and contains two seeds that resemble coffee beans.

Subspecies
Subspecies of Frangula californica include:

Frangula californica subsp. californica — California coffeeberry; widespread in western California. Fruit with two seeds; twigs red; leaves with conspicuous veins.
Frangula californica subsp. crassifolia  — serpentine hoary coffeeberry; endemic to the Inner North California Coast Ranges, on serpentine soils.
Frangula californica subsp. cuspidata — Sierra hoary coffeeberry; Southern Sierras, Transverse Ranges, Peninsular Ranges.
Frangula californica subsp. occidentalis — Western California coffeeberry; on serpentine soils in northern California and southwestern Oregon, in the Klamath Mountains and North California Coast Ranges. Fruit with three seeds; twigs brown; leaves with inconspicuous veins.
Frangula californica subsp. tomentella — hoary coffeeberry.
Frangula californica subsp. ursina — desert hoary coffeeberry; endemic to the San Bernardino Mountains and Mojave Desert sky islands.

Ecology
This shrub is a member of many plant communities and grows in many types of habitat, including California chaparral and woodlands, coastal sage scrub, and California oak woodlands. It grows in forest types such as foggy coastal oak woodlands, Coast redwood forests, California mixed evergreen forests, and mountain coniferous forests.

It can be found alongside chaparral whitethorn (Ceanothus leucodermis), toyon (Heteromeles arbutifolia), skunkbush (Rhus trilobata), redberry (Rhamnus crocea), and western poison oak (Toxicodendron diversilobum). In brushy mountain habitat it grows among many species of manzanita.

The plant reproduces sexually by seed and vegetatively by sprouting. After wildfire or cutting, the plant generally resprouts from its root crown. Reproduction via seed is most common in mature stands of the plant. It produces seeds by 2 or 3 years of age. Seeds are mature in the fall. Seed dispersal is often performed by birds, which are attracted to the fruit; some plants are so stripped of fruit by birds that hardly any seeds fall below the parent plant.

This long-lived plant is persistent and becomes a dominant species in many habitat types, such as coastal woodlands. In the absence of wildfire, the shrub can grow large, with a wide spread that can shade out other flora. When fire occurs, the plant can be very damaged but it readily resprouts from the surviving root crown, which is covered in buds for the purpose. It reaches its pre-burn size relatively quickly.

Parts of the plant, including the foliage and fruit, are food for wild animals such as mule deer, black bears, and many resident and migrating birds, as well as livestock.

Uses

Cultivation
This plant is cultivated as an ornamental plant by plant nurseries, for planting in native plant, water conserving, and wildlife gardens; in large pots and containers; and in natural landscaping and habitat restoration projects.

It is also used for erosion control, and is usually deer resistant. As a pollinator plant it is of special value to native butterflies and bees.

Cultivars
Cultivars of the species, for use as an ornamental plant, include:
Frangula (Rhamnus) californica 'Eve Case' — Eve Case coffeeberry; smaller and more compact (3-6' H x 3-4' W), with denser foliage and larger berries than species. Introduced by the Saratoga Horticultural Foundation in 1975.
Frangula (Rhamnus) californica 'Leatherleaf' —  Leatherleaf coffeeberry; with black-green foliage. 
Frangula (Rhamnus) californica 'Mound San Bruno' — smaller leaves, more dense and compact, particularly tolerant of garden conditions.
Frangula (Rhamnus) californica ‘Seaview’ — a ground cover variety.

Food and medicine
Ingestion of ripe Frangula californica berries causes nausea and vomiting, although there are claims that the berries and seeds are safe and edible. The seeds inside the berries have been used to make coffee substitute.

Although the plant itself looks much like a coffee plant, its berries, which are succulent, do not.

Native Americans of the west coast of North America had several uses for the plant as food, and used parts of it as a traditional medicinal plant. Several tribes of the indigenous peoples of California ate the fruit fresh or dried.

The Ohlone people used the leaves to treat poison oak dermatitis. The Kumeyaay people had similar uses for its bark. The Kawaiisu used the fruit to treat wounds such as burns. The bark was widely used as a laxative by the indigenous peoples.

Names for the plant in the Konkow language of the Concow tribe include pä and pö.

References

External links

Calflora Database: Frangula californica (California coffeeberry)
USDA Plants Profile for Frangula californica (California buckthorn)
Jepson eFlora (TJM2) treatment of Frangula californica
Jepson Manual (TJM93) archived page: Rhamnus californica
Frangula californica — UC Photos gallery

californica
Flora of Arizona
Flora of California
Flora of Nevada
Flora of New Mexico
Flora of Oregon
Flora of Northwestern Mexico
Flora of the Klamath Mountains
Flora of the Sierra Nevada (United States)
Natural history of the California chaparral and woodlands
Natural history of the California Coast Ranges
Natural history of the Mojave Desert
Natural history of the Peninsular Ranges
Natural history of the San Francisco Bay Area
Natural history of the Santa Monica Mountains
Natural history of the Transverse Ranges
Plants used in traditional Native American medicine
Garden plants of North America
Bird food plants
Drought-tolerant plants